The 2014–15 Women's FA Cup was the 45th staging of the FA Women's Cup, a knockout cup competition for women's football teams in England. Arsenal were the defending champions, having beaten Everton 2–0 in the previous final, but lost in the quarter finals to Chelsea. The 2015 Final took place at Wembley Stadium for the first time, and was held on 1 August 2015. The match was televised live on BBC One.

Teams
A total of 257 teams entered the 2014–15 FA Women's Cup, with the level of league football played by each team determining the stage of the competition where they were inserted. Teams which played in WSL1, the highest level of league football for women in England, entered in the fifth round.

The preliminary round, first, second and third qualifying rounds, and the second round proper each saw one tie cancelled due to the withdrawal or disqualification of one of the teams.

Prize fund

Preliminary round
64 teams entered this stage, with the matches being played on 7 September 2014 and the winners receiving £125. The draw was made on 29 August 2014.

N.B. the team progressing to the next round is shown in bold.

First round qualifying
The draw was made on 29 August 2014.

Second round qualifying

Third Round qualifying
45 clubs belonging to the Women's Premier League division one's Midlands, North, South and South West leagues entered at this stage of the competition.

First round
The draw for the first round was made on 3 November 2014. All ties with the exception of the matches at Chorley and C&K Basildon were played on 6 December 2014. The remaining two took place on 14 December 2014.

Second round
The FA Women's Premier League teams entered at this stage. All matches were played on 11 January 2015. The ties between Blackburn Rovers and Liverpool Marshall and Swindon Town and Carshalton Athletic were postponed with the later facing a FA investigation. Blackburn Rovers and Liverpool Marshall eventually played the match on 25 January after postponements due to a waterlogged and frozen pitches. Carhalton Athletic were awarded a walkover as Swindon Town were ejected from the competition for fielding an ineligible player in the 3rd round of qualifying.

Third round
The draw for the 3rd round was made at Wembley on 12 January 2015. Sides from the FA WSL 2 league enter the competition at this stage. All ties were played on 1 February 2015, with the exception of Doncaster's tie which was staged the day before. The winners of each match received £400. Six matches were rearranged for 8 February due to adverse weather conditions.

Fourth round
The draw for the fourth round was made on 2 February. Matches played on 8 March 2015.

Fifth round / Round of 16
The eight winners of round four are joined by the eight 2014 FA WSL teams. The draw was held on 9 March 2015. Besides the eight WSL 1 teams, there remain four WSL 2 and four teams from the Premier League (Level 3) teams: Charlton Athletic, Coventry City, Sheffield, Tottenham. Matches played on 22 March.

Quarter-finals
The draw for the quarter-finals was made on 23 March 2015. Matches were played on 12 April.

Semi-finals
The draw for the semi-finals was made on 13 April 2015. The Everton v Notts County game was played on 3 May at Goodison Park. The Chelsea v Manchester City game took place on 4 May at Adams Park.

Final

The final of the FA Women's Cup was held for the first time at Wembley Stadium. It was played on 1 August 2015. The match was broadcast live on BBC One.

References

External links
Official site
Season at soccerway.com

Women's FA Cup seasons
Cup